Bollington railway station was a railway station serving the town of Bollington in Cheshire, England. It was opened in 1869 by the Macclesfield, Bollington and Marple Railway (MB&M) - a joint line constructed and operated by the Manchester, Sheffield and Lincolnshire Railway (MS&L) and North Staffordshire Railways (NSR). The passenger station was on the north side of Grimshaw Lane, with a goods yard on the south side.

A number of additional services were supplied between Bollington and Macclesfield, as a significant number of Macclesfield workers lived in Bollington. In 1921, there were 14 additional shuttle services between the two towns using a petrol railcar purchased by the Great Central Railway (GCR) (successor to the MS&L) and nicknamed the "Bollington Bug". The Bug was replaced in 1935 by a Sentinel steam railcar that ran the shuttle service, until it was withdrawn at the start of 1939.

The station buildings were built to NSR designs, as were most other structures on the MB&M, while most train services were operated by the MS&L and later the GCR.

The station closed in January 1970, along with the line between Macclesfield and Marple; the buildings were demolished and the track was lifted by the end of 1971.  The trackbed now forms part of the Middlewood Way, a recreational path between Macclesfield and Marple. Part of the goods station site provides a car park for the path.

References
Notes

Sources

Railway stations in Great Britain opened in 1869
Railway stations in Great Britain closed in 1970
Disused railway stations in Cheshire
Former Macclesfield Committee stations
1869 establishments in England
Beeching closures in England